Mustafa Zaman Abbasi (born 8 December 1936) is a Bangladeshi musicologist. He was awarded Ekushey Padak in 1995 by the Government of Bangladesh. Abbasi is the youngest son of folk singer-composer Abbas Uddin Ahmed. As of 2016, he serves as a senior research scholar at the "Kazi Nazrul Islam and Abbasuddin Research and Study Centre" of Independent University, Bangladesh.

Background
Abbasi is the third son of Abbasuddin Ahmed. His eldest brother Mustafa Kamal was the Chief Justice of Bangladesh. His sister Ferdausi Rahman is a playback singer. Abbasi was trained by Indian classical musicians including Ustad Muhammad Hussain Khasru and Ustad Gul Mohammad Khan.

Works
Abbasi has published more than fifty books in total. He has published two books on Bhawaiya music with staff notation of about 1,200 songs. He has published several books on poems of Jalaluddin Rumi, Niffari and Sultan Bahu. His books include "Abbasuddin Ahmed, Manush o Shilpi", "Kazi Nazrul Islam, Man and Poet" and "Puribo Ekaki".

He anchored television programs including "Amar Thikana" and "Bhora Nadeer Banke".

Awards
 Ekushey Padak (1995)
 Apex Foundation Award
 Natyasobha Award
 Bengal Centenary Award
 Abbasuddin Gold Medal
 Manik Mia Award
 Sylhet Music Award 
 Lalon Parishad Award

Personal life
Abbasi is married to Asma Abbasi. His daughters are Samira Abbasi and Sharmini Abbasi.

References 

Living people
1936 births
Bangladeshi male musicians
Recipients of the Ekushey Padak in arts
Honorary Fellows of Bangla Academy
Bangladeshi people of Indian descent
Musicians from West Bengal
St. Gregory's High School and College alumni